Dmytro Oleksandrovych Korchynsky (born 22 January 1964) is a Ukrainian writer, poet, militant, and political activist who is the former leader of the far-right Ukrainian National Assembly – Ukrainian People's Self-Defence (UNA-UNSO) organisation. According to some researchers, he is a professional provocateur who cooperates with the secret services.

Early life and career 
Dmytro Oleksandrovych Korchynsky was born on 22 January 1964 in Kyiv, Ukraine. In 1982, he finished a high school and enrolled in the Kyiv Institute of Food Industry at the Department of Industrial Power Generation. After two years of study, he left the institute without finishing. Later, Korchynsky participated in number of archaeological expeditions in the Southern Ukraine.

From 1985 to 1987, he served in the Soviet army. Korchynsky was in the 24th Mechanized Brigade of the Carpathian Military District as a commander of BMP-2. After demobilization he was dismissed in reserves as an assistant to a platoon leader. In 1987, Korchynsky enrolled in the Kyiv University, but left later that year.

From 1987 to 1988, Korchynsky was a member of the Ukrainian Helsinki Group.

Leader of UNA-UNSO 
Under his leadership, UNSO took part in several armed conflicts on the territory of the former Soviet Union, including Transnistria, Abkhazia and Chechnya. In 1992, as a volunteer, he left for Transnistria. In 1996 Korchynsky participated in the Chechen war. Next year he was completely ousted from the nationalist movement in Ukraine.

In the fall of 1992 he unsuccessfully ran for a seat in the Verkhovna Rada, placing fourth out of six in the 13th electoral district. Korchynsky ran again in 1994 and was again unsuccessful, this time placing third out of 24 in the 2nd electoral district in Kyiv.

Post-UNA-UNSO political career 
After being excluded from UNA-UNSO in 1997, Korchynsky became a media pundit and political analyst. He founded the Bratstvo Organization in 2002, which he claims has several hundred members in Kyiv, Kharkiv, Odesa and Chernihiv. Bratstvo was not officially registered until March 2004. Though the group describes itself as an Orthodox Christian organization, it is not affiliated with any of the three Orthodox churches operating in Ukraine. He has described his group in his self-published newsletter as the Orthodox Taliban, and on his website as a Christian Hezbollah Anton Shekhovtsov, a well-known specialist on far-right organizations spoke of Korchynsky as being “widely considered an agent provocateur, and his "Bratstvo" already took part in several actions that were meant to provoke police suppression of peaceful protests”.

During the 2002 Ukrainian parliamentary election, Korchynsky ran again for the Verkhovna Rada as a member of the All-Ukrainian Party of Workers. He placed eighth out of 23 in the 220th electoral district.

On 29 December 2003, Bratstvo organized a street fight with the Berkut near the Canadian Embassy in Kyiv. A fewew days earlier on 25 December 2003, Ukrayinska Pravda received some correspondence from other journalists about intentions of the government to discredit opposition by connecting it to the problem with the arrested Ukrainian plane (Antonov An-124 Ruslan) in Canada. On 31 March 2004, members of Bratstvo poured glue and then water onto George Soros during the forum among human rights organizations in Kyiv "Human rights at elections". In summer of 2004 in Kerch Bratstvo organized a strike at the Zaliv Shipbuilding yard, co-owner of which was David Zhvania, a member of Our Ukraine.

In the fall of 2004, Korchynsky participated in the presidential elections. After losing in the first round, Korchynsky supported pro-Russian candidate Viktor Yanukovych. After Viktor Yushchenko was announced a winner, Korchynsky joined the opposition.

In 2005, the Russian Putinist youth organisation Nashi invited Korchynsky to a youth summer camp to teach "how to prevent public disturbances" and how to confront the threat of an Orange Revolution reprisal in Russia. In 2013 during the Euromaidan protests, 300 members of the Bratstvo organization led by Korchynsky attacked the presidential administration building (of then president Viktor Yanukovych). He then became a fugitive on the international wanted list of the Ministry of Internal Affairs for his role in inciting riots during the Euromaidan-related 1 December 2013 Euromaidan riots. On 2 January 2013, during the program "Freedom of Speech" on ICTV, Serhiy Sobolev claimed that Korchynsky cooperates with Viktor Medvedchuk.

In the 2014 Ukrainian parliamentary election, Korchynsky's wife Oksana placed 24th on the (nationwide) party list of Radical Party and she was elected into the Verkhovna Rada.

After the Revolution of Dignity, Korchynsky returned to Ukraine and founded the St. Mary's battalion to fight in the Russo-Ukrainian War. These separatists have, according to independent experts, been armed and helped by regular soldiers from Russia. Russia has opened several criminal cases against Korchynsky on "terrorist" charges.

Personal life

He is the President of the Institute of Regional Politics and Modern Political Science.

He is an author of a poem collection "Philosophy of distemper" (2002), an author of the following books: "War in the crowd" (1998), "This and It" (2002) and "Revolution haute couture" (2004). His books are banned in Russia based on its law on extremism.

See also
Brotherhood (Ukrainian political party)

References

External links
Official blog
Bratstvo website. "Down with Democracy. Let Freedom live!"
Profile of the All-Ukrainian Party of Workers. DATA (Center of Political Information)
Profile of BRATSTVO. DATA (Center of Political Information)

1964 births
Living people
Politicians from Kyiv
Writers from Kyiv
Poets from Kyiv
Military personnel from Kyiv
Candidates in the 2004 Ukrainian presidential election
Ukrainian fascists
Neo-fascist politicians